Asheq Ullah Rafiq is a Bangladesh Awami League politician and the incumbent member of parliament of Cox's Bazar-2.

Early life
Asheq Ullah Rafiq was born on 24 July 1971. He completed his undergraduate and post graduate studies in accounting and finance. He was born in an illustrious political family in Cox'sBazar. Mr. Rafiq is engaged in student politics since his college days in Chittagong and after finishing his formal education he got himself actively in Awame League in his home town Coxs'Bazar and village Moheskhali.

Career
Rafiq was elected to parliament from Cox's Bazar-2 as a Bangladesh Awami League candidate on 5 January 2014.

References

Awami League politicians
Living people
11th Jatiya Sangsad members
10th Jatiya Sangsad members
1971 births
Bangladeshi people
People from Cox's Bazar District